is a fighting video game that was released for the PlayStation in 1995.

Ports and sequels
Zero Divide, Windows (1996) - developed by Kinesoft and published by GameBank in Japan, and Interplay in the United States. In 1999 it was included in the German compilation All You Can Play: 10 Action-Games.
Zero Divide 2: The Secret Wish, PlayStation (June 27, 1997) - developed and published by Zoom. Sony published Zero Divide 2 in Europe in 1998. No company expressed interest in publishing the game in North America.
Zero Divide: The Final Conflict, Sega Saturn (November 20, 1997) - Japan-exclusive, developed and published by Zoom.

Reception

The game sold 228,950 units in Japan and 27,049 units in the United States, for a combined  units sold in Japan and the United States.

Upon the PlayStation version's release, critics generally praised the graphics, techno soundtrack, variety of character designs, solid gameplay, and the way fighters can hang onto the edge of the ring, but criticized the difficulty in executing special moves and felt that some opponents were overpowered. They also noted similarities to the gameplay mechanics of the Virtua Fighter series.

GameFan called Zero Divide "one of the best 3-D fighting games of all time" and praised "innovative little extras like dangling off the side of the ring and the transparent limb effect" as well as the Tiny Phalanx shoot 'em up minigame, concluding Zero Divide "to be one of the best designed, programmed, and tweaked fighting games yet." Next Generation remarked that while having android characters is innovative, the characters are generally so bizarre that they are difficult to identify with, and their generic move sets fail to justify their "outlandish" designs. Game Informer said it "has everything you would expect from a next generation fighter, lots of action, fast moving polygon fighters, tons of moves, and most importantly solid game mechanics." Computer and Video Games stated that it is "in some ways even better" than the original Virtua Fighter and offers "serious competition" against Tekken, saying that Zero Divide is "better looking" and "more intuitive", concluding it to be "a stunning, finely-tuned game". GamePro concluded, "Although it lacks the solid fighting foundation that would make it great, Zero Divide has moments of greatness." The four reviewers of Electronic Gaming Monthly scored it 29 out of 40 (7.25 out of 10 average), saying it "grows on you." Maximum gave it three out of five stars, calling it "an average beat 'em up destined to be ignored by discerning PlayStation owners."

Next Generation reviewed the PlayStation version of the game, and stated that "It's easy to see the attraction. The character control well, combinations come naturally, and it's smoothly animated, close to PlayStation standards set by Battle Arena Toshinden (although not up to the super-fluidity of Virtua Fighter 2)."

See also
Phalanx (video game)
List of PlayStation games
List of PSone Classics (Japan)
List of Sega Saturn games

References

External links
ZOOM Inc. page (PS3/PSP)
GAMEBANK Corp. page
Kinesoft page
CyberFront Corporation page
Zero Divide (Windows) at GameFAQs
Zero Divide at MobyGames
Zero Divide 2: The Secret Wish at GameFAQs
Zero Divide 2: The Secret Wish at MobyGames
Zero Divide: The Final Conflict at GameFAQs
Zero Divide: The Final Conflict at Giant Bomb
Zero Divide games at Giant Bomb
Zero Divide series at MobyGames

1995 video games
Kinesoft games
PlayStation (console) games
PlayStation Network games
Sega Saturn games
Windows games
Ocean Software games
Zoom (video game company) games
Video games about robots
Fighting games
Video game franchises
Multiplayer and single-player video games
Cyberpunk video games
Video games developed in Japan
CyberFront games